David Mura (born 1952) is an American author, poet, novelist, playwright, critic and performance artist whose writings explore the themes of race, identity and history. In 2018, Mura has published a book on creative writing, A Stranger’s Journey: Race, Identity & Narrative Craft in Writing, in which he argues for a more inclusive and expansive definition of craft.

Mura has published two memoirs, Turning Japanese: Memoirs of a Sansei, which won the Josephine Miles Book Award from the Oakland PEN and was listed in the New York Times Notable Books of the Year, and Where the Body Meets Memory: An Odyssey of Race, Sexuality and Identity (1995). His most recent book of poetry is The Last Incantation (2014); his other poetry books include After We Lost Our Way, which won the National Poetry Contest, The Colors of Desire (winner of the Carl Sandburg Literary Award), and Angels for the Burning. His novel is Famous Suicides of the Japanese Empire (Coffee House Press, 2008).

Mura communicates frequently through his social media accounts: blog.davidmura.com; @MuraDavid

Early life and education
David Mura was born in 1952 and grew up in Chicago, Illinois, the oldest of four children. He is a third generation Japanese American son of parents interned during World War II. After the war, his father changed the family name "Uemura" to "Mura." His grandparents came to USA from Japan before the Russo-Japanese War (1904).

Mura earned his B.A. from Grinnell College and his M.F.A. in creative writing from Vermont College of Fine Arts. He has taught at the University of Minnesota, St. Olaf College, The Loft Literary Center, and the University of Oregon. He currently resides in Saint Paul, Minnesota, with his wife Susan Sencer and their three children; Samantha, Nikko and Tomo.

Published works
Full-Length Poetry Collections
 The Last Incantations (Northwestern University Press, 2014)
 Angels for the Burning: Poems (BOA Editions, Ltd., 2004)
 The Colors of Desire: Poems (Anchor Books, 1995)
 After We Lost Our Way (Dutton, 1989; Carnegie-Mellon Press, 1997 - 2nd Edition)

Novels
 Famous Suicides of the Japanese Empire (Coffee House Press, 2008)

Memoirs/Nonfiction
 Where the Body Meets Memory: An Odyssey of Race, Sexuality and Identity (Anchor Books, 1995)
 Turning Japanese: Memoirs of a Sansei (Atlantic Monthly Press, 1991; Anchor Books, 1992; Grove Press, 2005 - 3rd Edition)
 A Male Grief: Notes on Pornography and Addiction: An Essay (Milkweed Editions, 1987; republished as an Amazon e-book 2010)

Literary Craft/Criticism
 Song for Uncle Tom, Tonto, and Mr. Moto: Poetry and Identity (University of Michigan Press, 2002)
 A Stranger’s Journey: Race, Identity & Narrative Craft in Writing (University of Georgia Press, 2018)

Films
Slowly, This—written & featuring David Mura & Alexs Pate; dir. by Arthur Jafa; produced by the PBS Series ALIVE TV, 1995
Relocations—written and performed by David Mura; directed by Mark Tang (four selections from the performance piece, Relocations: Images from a Sansei), 1998

Awards and honors
His honors include two NEA fellowships, the 1994 Lila Wallace-Reader's Digest Writers Award (which includes a cash prize of $105,000), and a US/Japan Creative Artist Fellowship, two Bush Foundation Fellowships, four Loft-McKnight Awards, several Minnesota State Arts Board grants, and a Discovery/The Nation Award. He has had his work published in literary journals and magazines including The Nation, The American Poetry Review, The New Republic, The Missouri Review, and Crazyhorse.

 1994 Lila Wallace-Reader's Digest Writers Award
 1993 National Endowment for the Arts - Literature Fellowships
 1988 National Poetry Series
 1987 Discovery/The Nation Award
 1985 National Endowment for the Arts - Literature Fellowships
 1984 U.S. - Japan Creative Artist Fellowship

References

External links
 Biography: Poetry Foundation > Poet > David Mura Biography
 Author Website
 Library of Congress Online Catalog > David Mura

American writers of Japanese descent
1952 births
Living people
Vermont College of Fine Arts alumni
Writers from Minneapolis
Writers from Chicago
20th-century American novelists
21st-century American novelists
American male novelists
American memoirists
American poets
American poets of Asian descent
American novelists of Asian descent
St. Olaf College faculty
University of Oregon faculty
University of Minnesota faculty
20th-century American poets
21st-century American poets
American male poets
American male essayists
20th-century American essayists
21st-century American essayists
PEN Oakland/Josephine Miles Literary Award winners
20th-century American male writers
21st-century American male writers
Novelists from Illinois
Novelists from Minnesota
Novelists from Oregon